Tenmile is an unincorporated community in Coos County, Oregon, United States. Tenmile Lake was named for Tenmile Creek, which was said to be ten miles south of Winchester Bay.

References

External links
Historic image of Tenmile Lake from Salem Public Library
Images of Tenmile from Flickr

Unincorporated communities in Oregon
Unincorporated communities in Coos County, Oregon